A defense contractor is a business organization or individual that provides products or services to a military or intelligence department of a government. Products typically include military or civilian aircraft, ships, vehicles, weaponry, and electronic systems, while services can include logistics, technical support and training, communications support, and engineering support in cooperation with the government.

Security contractors do not generally provide direct support of military operations. Under the 1949 Geneva Conventions, military contractors engaged in direct support of military operations may be legitimate targets of military interrogation.

In the United States, defense contracting has taken an increasingly larger role. In 2009, the Department of Defense spent nearly $316 billion on contracts. Contractors have assumed a much larger on-the-ground presence during American conflicts: during the 1991 Gulf War the ratio of uniformed military to contractors was about 50 to 1, while during the first four years of the Iraq War the U.S. hired over 190,000 contractors, surpassing the total American military presence even during the 2007 Iraq surge and 23 times greater than other allied military personnel numbers. In Afghanistan, the presence of almost 100,000 contractors has resulted in a near 1-to-1 ratio with military personnel. The surge in spending on defense services contractors that began in 2001 came to a halt in 2009, leading to the Better Buying Power initiative of 2010.

List of companies 
This is a list of the world's largest arms manufacturers and other military service companies, along with their countries of origin. The information is based on a list published by the Stockholm International Peace Research Institute for 2020. The numbers are in billions of US dollars.

See also
 Arms industry
 Government contractor
 List of private military contractors
 List of United States defense contractors
 Military–industrial complex
 Private intelligence agency
 Private military company
 Companies by arms sales

References

External links
The British Library - finding information on the defence industry
 Private Security Transnational Enterprises in Colombia
 Human Rights First; Private Security Contractors at War: Ending the Culture of Impunity (2008)
 Defense Contracting Jobseekers FAQ

 D
Defense
Military corporations
Military lists
Weapons manufacturing companies

ru:Список 100 крупнейших мировых компаний ВПК (2013)